Ust-Kishert is the name of several rural localities in Russia:
Ust-Kishert, Perm Krai, a selo in Kishertsky District of Perm Krai
Ust-Kishert, Sverdlovsk Oblast, a village in Artinsky District of Sverdlovsk Oblast